RHS Garden Wisley is a garden run by the Royal Horticultural Society in Wisley, Surrey, south of London. It is one of five gardens run by the society, the others being Harlow Carr, Hyde Hall, Rosemoor, and Bridgewater (which opened on 18 May 2021). Wisley is the second most visited paid entry garden in the United Kingdom after the Royal Botanic Gardens, Kew, with 1,232,772 visitors in 2019.

History
Wisley was founded by Victorian businessman and RHS member George Ferguson Wilson, who purchased a 60-acre (243,000 m²) site in 1878. He established the "Oakwood Experimental Garden" on part of the site, where he attempted to "make difficult plants grow successfully". Wilson died in 1902 and Oakwood (which was also known as Glebe Farm) was purchased by Sir Thomas Hanbury, the creator of the celebrated garden La Mortola on the Italian Riviera. He gave the Wisley site to the RHS in 1903.

Directors have included;
 Frederick Chittenden (1919–1931)
 Robert Lewis Harrow (1931–1946)
 John Gilmour (1946–1951)
 Harold Roy Fletcher (1951–1954)
 Francis Philip Knight (1954–1969)
 Christopher Brickell (1969–1985)
   Peter Joseph Maudsley (1985–1987)
 Philip McMillan Browse

Description
Wisley is now a large and diverse garden covering 240 acres (971,000 m²). In addition to numerous formal and informal decorative gardens, several glasshouses and an extensive arboretum, it includes a trials field where new cultivars are assessed. The original laboratory, for both scientific research and training, was originally opened in 1907, but proved inadequate. It was expanded and its exterior was rebuilt during World War I. It was designated a Grade II Listed building in 1985. Visitor numbers increased significantly from 5,250 in 1905, to 11,000 in 1908, 48,000 in the late 1920s, and 170,000 in 1957, and passed 400,000 in 1978, 500,000 in 1985, and 600,000 in 1987.

In April 2005, Alan Titchmarsh cut the turf to mark the start of construction of the Bicentenary Glasshouse. This major new feature covers three quarters of an acre (3,000 m²) and overlooks a new lake built at the same time. It is divided into three main planting zones representing desert, tropical and temperate climates. It was budgeted at £7.7 million and opened on 26 June 2007. A £20 million Welcome Building including a larger restaurant, cafe and visitor facilities was opened by Alan Titchmarsh on 10 June 2019.

Features

Wisley has a large number of features, including the following:
RHS Hilltop - The home of Gardening Science
Wildlife Garden, Wellbeing Garden & World Food Garden
Glasshouse with desert, tropical and temperate climates, and with special topical displays
Clore Learning Centre
Alpine houses
Laboratory
Library
Plant information centre
Trials field (where plants are submitted for trial, allowing some to be awarded the prestigious Award of Garden Merit)
Fruit field, featuring large numbers of apples, pears and other fruit grown in various forms.
Rock garden and alpine meadow on a sloping site
Wild garden
Walled garden
Canal with water lilies in season
Battleston Hill, which includes many rhododendrons and azaleas
Rose borders and mixed borders
Jubilee arboretum
Pinetum
National heather collection

Visitor facilities include cafés and restaurant, car parks, plant centre, etc.

Gallery

References

Bibliography

External links

 
 1987 Advertisement for Director

Wisley
Botanical gardens in England
Gardens in Surrey
Greenhouses in the United Kingdom
Borough of Guildford
Wisley
Woodland gardens
1878 establishments in England